, is an eccentric asteroid, classified as near-Earth object and potentially hazardous asteroid of the Apollo group. First observed by the Spacewatch survey on 8 October 2004, it may be a fragment of Comet Encke and is the source of the Northern Taurids meteor shower seen annually in November and the June Beta Taurids. The asteroid may be larger than one kilometer in diameter.

Orbit 

 orbits the Sun at a distance of 0.3–4.2 AU once every 3 years and 4 months (1,220 days). Its orbit has an eccentricity of 0.86 and an inclination of 4° with respect to the ecliptic.

Physical characteristics 

According to the survey carried out by the NEOWISE mission of NASA's Wide-field Infrared Survey Explorer, the asteroid measures 1.316 kilometers in diameter and its surface has an exceptionally low albedo of 0.018, while Porubcan estimates a diameter of 350 to 780 meters, based on an albedo of 0.25 to 0.05, which typically covers most S-type and C-type asteroids.

References

External links 
 
 
 

Discoveries by the Spacewatch project
Minor planet object articles (unnumbered)

20041008